Consultive Junta may refer to:

 Consultive Junta (Guatemala) of Guatemala (1821–1822), see Central America under Mexican rule
 Consultive Junta (El Salvador) of El Salvador (1823)